Robert Francis Thomas Doe,  (10 March 1920 – 21 February 2010) was a British fighter pilot and flying ace of the Second World War. He flew with the Royal Air Force during the Battle of Britain, and was seconded to the Indian Air Force during the Burma campaign.

Early life
Robert Francis Thomas Doe was born in Reigate, Surrey, on 10 March 1920. After leaving school before taking examinations he started work as an office boy for the News of the World. Doe joined the Royal Air Force Volunteer Reserve in March 1938 and made his first solo flight on 16 June 1938.

Second World War
After applying for a short service commission, Doe joined the Royal Air Force in January 1939. Doe trained with 15 E&RFTS (Elementary & Reserve Flying Training School) at RAF Redhill, Surrey and combat training with 6 Flying Training School at RAF Little Rissington.

Doe was posted on 6 November 1939 to No. 234 Squadron, a Spitfire Squadron at RAF Leconfield alongside Australian Pat Hughes, who would later become an ace. Doe served with No. 234 squadron for most of the Battle of Britain. Doe claimed his first victory on 15 August 1940 when he shot down two Messerschmitt Bf 110s followed by a Messerschmitt Bf 109 and a Dornier Do 18 on 16 August, a Bf 109 destroyed (of JG 52) and another Bf 109 damaged on 18 August, a half-share of a KG 54 Junkers Ju 88 on 21 August and a Bf 109 shot down on 26 August 1940. In September, he added to his tally with No. 234 Squadron with three Bf 110s on 4 September, a shared JG 53 Bf 109 on 5 September, three damaged Dornier Do 17s and a Bf 109 shot down on 6 September, and a Heinkel He 111 destroyed on 7 September.

On 27 September 1940 Doe was posted to No. 238 Squadron, flying Hurricanes from RAF Middle Wallop in Wiltshire, claiming his first victory for the squadron on 30 September by shooting down a KG 55 He 111. In October, Doe shot down a Bf 110 on 1 October and a Ju 88 on 7 October, the last of his 14 and 2 shared aerial victories of the battle and of the war.

On 10 October, in combat over Warmwell, Dorset with some Bf 109s at 12:00, his plane was critically damaged and he was wounded in the leg and shoulder. Doe bailed out, landing on Brownsea Island while his Hawker Hurricane crashed near Corfe Castle viaduct on what is now part of the Swanage Railway. Admitted to Poole Hospital on 22 October 1940, Doe was awarded the Distinguished Flying Cross and received a Bar a month later on 26 November. Doe rejoined No. 238 Squadron in December 1940.

In January 1941, while flying a night sortie, the oil in the oil cooler of his aircraft froze. As a result of his engine seizing he landed heavily at Warmwell on the snow-covered runway, breaking his harness and smashing his face against the reflector sight, almost severing his nose and breaking his arm. Doe was taken to Park Prewett Hospital where he underwent 22 operations by pioneering New Zealand plastic surgeon Harold Gillies. (After the war he was invited to join the Guinea Pig Club.)

On 15 May 1941 he was posted as a Flight Commander to No. 66 Squadron and then joined No. 130 Squadron on 18 August. The series of operations in a two-month period and the need to bring through fresh pilots who could be trained by experienced hands, meant Doe's career as a front line fighter pilot was over for the time being. On 22 October 1941 Doe was posted to No. 57 Operational Training Unit as an instructor. On 9 June 1943 Doe went to the Fighter Leaders School at RAF Milfield and then joined No. 118 Squadron at RAF Coltishall in July. In August 1943 he joined No. 613 Squadron.

In October 1943 Doe was posted to Burma as the activities on the Western Front changed from defence to attack in preparation for Operation Overlord and the invasion of Normandy; while in the East, the Japanese Army was still advancing on key British Empire assets, including India.

In December 1943 Doe was tasked with forming No. 10 Squadron of the Indian Air Force, commanding it throughout the Burma Campaign until April 1945 when he joined the Indian Army Staff College in Quetta and then from August the planning staff at Delhi. On 2 October 1945, Doe received the Distinguished Service Order for his leadership of No. 10 Squadron.

Later life
In September 1946, Doe returned to the UK, where he held several staff positions. He commanded No. 32 squadron in Egypt in 1952, and retired on 1 April 1966 with the rank of wing commander.

After retirement, Doe opened a garage business. He also wrote his autobiography Bob Doe – Fighter Pilot. He died on 21 February 2010, aged 89.

Quotations

Combat record
Source: Shores & Williams, Aces High, pp. 223–4

References

External links

 Wing Commander Bob Doe – Daily Telegraph obituary
 Wing Commander Bob Doe – The Times obituary

1920 births
2010 deaths
People from Reigate
Royal Air Force wing commanders
British World War II flying aces
Indian Air Force officers
Companions of the Distinguished Service Order
The Few
Members of the Guinea Pig Club
Recipients of the Distinguished Flying Cross (United Kingdom)
Royal Air Force pilots of World War II